The Snipe South American Championship is the annual South American Championship for sailing in the Snipe class.

The regatta is open to Snipe Class International Racing Association (SCIRA) registered boats and class member skippers and crews. The trophy is a donation of SCIRA Paraguay, and 3 races constitute a regatta with nine or eleven races scheduled, depending on local conditions.

It is held every year alternating venues around any country in South America.

Winners

^In 1981 the winning team was not from South America, as the Deed of Gift leaves the competition open to boats from any country.

References 

Snipe competitions
South American championships
Central and South American championships in sailing
Recurring sporting events established in 1975